Euriphene alberici is a butterfly in the family Nymphalidae. It is found in the Democratic Republic of the Congo, from the eastern part of the country to Kivu.

References

Butterflies described in 1945
Euriphene
Endemic fauna of the Democratic Republic of the Congo
Butterflies of Africa